(in ) is a short oral story in Russian folklore about a supernatural incident: a case that took place in reality, without focusing on the personal testimony of the narrator (in contrast to the bailichka, where the story is conducted on behalf of the "eyewitness"). It echoes the term urban legend.

 (in comparison with bailichka) is already closer to legends and fairy tales ("people say that...").

History
The terms  and  became known among the people no later than the 19th century.

A more complete study of the  took place in the second half of the 20th century. Erna Pomérantseva proposed a clear distinction between the terms  and : "the term   corresponds to the concept of superstitious memorat...

See also
Bailichka

References

Russian folklore